Marie Decugis (7 August 1884 – 4 May 1969; née Flameng; also Décugis) was a French tennis player.

Life 
Marie was born in 1884 the daughter of painter François Flameng (1856–1923) and his wife Marguerite Henriette Augusta (née Turquet; 1863–1919). She married the successful tennis player Max Decugis on 15 May 1905, at Paris. The couple had a daughter, Christiane Omer-Decugis (1909–1974).

Decugis won the title in mixed doubles, along with her husband, at the 1906 Intercalated Games at Athens. She played at the Wimbledon Championships in 1912 and 1920, but lost her initial match on both occasions.

She died at an age of 84 at Grasse.

References

External links 
 
 
 

1884 births
1969 deaths
French female tennis players
Tennis players at the 1906 Intercalated Games
Medalists at the 1906 Intercalated Games
Sportspeople from Dieppe, Seine-Maritime